Xi'an has a rich history dating back to more than 6000 years ago. The below is a detailed discussion on the city's history. See also Xi'an.

Timeline

Zhou dynasty established its capital in Feng and Hao between the late 11th century BC and 770 BC, both located west of contemporary Xi'an. In 770 BC, the capital was moved to Luoyang due to political unrest.
The state Qin moved its capital to Xianyang 350 BC just north of today's Xi'an on the north shore of Wei River.
Qin dynasty (221–206 BC) constructed its capital in Xianyang. It was burned by Xiang Yu at the end of the dynasty.
202 BC: Liu Bang, the founding emperor of the Han dynasty, established Chang'an province as his capital; his first palace Changle Palace was built across the river from the ruin of the Qin capital. This is traditionally regarded as the founding date of Chang'an and Xi'an.
200 BC: Emperor Liu Bang built Weiyang Palace in Chang'an.
194 BC: Construction of the first city wall of Chang'an began, which was not finished until 190. The wall measured 25.7 km in length, 12–16 m in thickness at the base. The area within the wall was ca. 36 km2.
AD 190: The most powerful tyrant of the time, Dong Zhuo, moved his court from Luoyang to Chang'an in a bid to avoid a coalition of powerful warlords going against him.
582: Emperor of Sui dynasty ordered a new capital to be built southeast of the Han capital, called Daxing (大興, great excitement). It consisted of three sections: the palace, the imperial city, and the civilian section. The total area within the wall was 84 km2, The main street Zhuque Avenue measured 155 m in width.  It was at the time the largest city in the world. The city was renamed Chang'an (長安, Perpetual Peace or Eternal Peace) by the Tang dynasty.
7th century: Buddhist monk Xuanzang established a sizeable translation centre after returning from India with Sanskrit scriptures.
652: Construction of Great Wild Goose Pagoda began. It measured 64 m in height. This pagoda was constructed for the storage of the translations of Buddhist sutras obtained from India by the monk Xuanzang.
707: Construction of Small Wild Goose Pagoda began. It measured 45 m in height. After the earthquake of 1556, its height was reduced to 43.4 m.
781: The Nestorian Stele, also known as the Nestorian Stone, Nestorian Monument or Nestorian Tablet, is a  stele erected during the Tang dynasty documenting 150 years of early Christianity in China.
904: The end of the Tang dynasty brought destruction to Chang'an. Residents were forced to move to Luoyang, the new capital. Only a small area continued to be occupied after the destruction.
13th century: Marco Polo said that the people of Xi'an were all idolaters.
1370: The Ming dynasty built a new wall to protect a much smaller city of 12 km2. The wall measured 11.9 km in circumference, 12 m in height, and 15–18 m in thickness at the base.
1936: Xi'an was the site of the Xi'an Incident during the Second Sino-Japanese War.  The Xi'an Incident brought the Communist Party of China and Kuomintang to a truce so the two forces could concentrate on fighting against Japan.
1949: May 20, 1949: The People's Liberation Army captured the city of Xi'an from the Kuomintang.

References

Further reading

External links